is a Japanese television drama series, the 67th Asadora series broadcast on NHK. It was aired on September 30, 2002 and ended on March 29, 2003. The drama tells about a young woman who studies to become a meteorologist.

Plot

Cast

Main characters 
 Mao Miyaji as Manten Hidaka
 Chiaki Saito as young Manten Hidaka
 Takashi Fujii as Yōhei Hanayama
 Riku Nishimoto as Sora Hanayama
 Nobuko Miyamoto as Yuriko Hanayama
 Katsuhisa Namase as Keisuke Hanayama
 Serina Suzuki as Nishiki Hanayama (her maiden name was Shinohara)
 Atsuko Asano as Mihoko Hozumi (her maiden name was Hidaka)
 Tatsuya Mihashi as Genji Hidaka
 Hidekazu Akai as Genkichi Hidaka
 Kiyoshi Hikawa as Hideo Hidaka
 Fumiyo Kohinata as Jinroku Hozumi
 Mitsuki Tanimura as Mikai Hozumi
 Yuriko Hirooka as Fumiko Tanaka

Kuroda family
 Nobuaki Kakuda as Masami Kuroda
 Midoriko Kimura as Kazue Kuroda
 Hanako Yamada as Tsubame Kuroda
 Yoshinori Yasuda as Iwao Kuroda
 Kazuyuki Maeda as Kojiro Kuroda

External links 

Asadora
2002 Japanese television series debuts
2003 Japanese television series endings